The second season of Food Paradise, an American food reality television series narrated by Mason Pettit on the Travel Channel, premiered on November 24, 2010. First-run episodes of the series aired in the United States on the Travel Channel on Mondays at 10:00 p.m. EDT. The season contained 5 episodes and concluded airing on December 22, 2010.

Food Paradise features the best places to find various cuisines at food locations across America. Each episode focuses on a certain type of restaurant, such as "Diners", "Bars", "Drive-Thrus" or "Breakfast" places that people go to find a certain food specialty.

Episodes

Bacon Paradise

Food Truck Paradise

Deep Fried Paradise 2: Extra Crispy

Pasta Paradise

Pie Paradise

References

External links
Food Paradise @Travelchannel.com

2010 American television seasons